Kham Khuean Kaeo is a district (amphoe) of Yasothon province in northeastern Thailand.

History
In 1917, the district was renamed Lumphuk after its central sub-district. In 1953 it was returned to its original name, Kham Khuean Kaeo.

When Yasothon was separated from Ubon Ratchathani province, Kham Khuean Kaeo was one of the districts which was assigned to the new province.

Geography
Neighboring districts are (from the northwest clockwise): Mueang Yasothon and Pa Tio of Yasothon Province; Hua Taphan of Amnat Charoen province; Khueang Nai of Ubon Ratchathani province; Maha Chana Chai of Yasothon Province; and Phanom Phrai of Roi Et province.

Administration
The district is divided into 13 sub-districts (tambons) which make up 115 villages (mubans). Kham Khuean Kaeo is a sub-district municipality (thesaban tambon) which covers parts of the sub-district Lumphuk. Each of the sub-districts have a tambon administrative organization (TAO).

References

External links
amphoe.com (Thai)

Districts of Yasothon province